Massanjore Dam is a hydropower generating dam over the Mayurakshi River located at Massanjore near Dumka in the state of Jharkhand, India. The Massanjore dam (also called Canada Dam ), across the Mayurakshi, was commissioned in 1955. It was formally inaugurated by Lester B. Pearson, Foreign Minister of Canada. 
The Mayurakshi River at the dam site has a catchment area of 1869 km2

Geography

Location

Dam 
It is 47.25 m high from its base and is 661.58 m long. The length of the overflow section is 225.60 m and is controlled by 21 bays, each 9.144 m wide. The design discharge is 4.446 cumecs. The full reservoir level is  121.34 m and the flood level is 122.56 m. It cost Rs. 16.10 crore.

Canal
Mayurakshi Left Bank Canal- Length 20.54 kilometres (Lined Canal).

Mayurakshi Right Bank Canal-Yet to be constructed.

Finance 
The dam was funded by the counterpart rupee fund created through supplies of wheat and other materials from Canada for use in India. Canada devoted those rupees to the further development of the Mayurakshi dam project.

Flood reserve 
Unfortunately, the Massanjore dam was not allowed to have a flood reserve. In 1956  the state government selectively took over flood control embankments till then maintained by the landlords or local bodies.

See also
 List of dams and reservoirs in India

External links

References

Dams in Jharkhand
Dumka district
Dams completed in 1955
1955 establishments in Bihar
20th-century architecture in India